Hau Pei-tsun (8 August 1919 – 30 March 2020) was a Chinese politician and military officer who was the Premier of the Republic of China (ROC) from 1 June 1990 to 27 February 1993, and the longest-serving Chief of the General Staff of the Republic of China Armed Forces from 1 December 1981 to 4 December 1989. On 6 July 2017, Hau attended an academic meeting in Nanjing about the history of the Second Sino-Japanese War, making him the first former ROC premier to visit Mainland China since the end of the Chinese Civil War in 1949. He turned 100 in August 2019.

Biography
Born to a well-to-do family in Yancheng, Jiangsu, on 8 August 1919, Hau received a military education from the Republic of China Military Academy, National Defense University, U.S. Army Command and General Staff College, and the War College, Armed Forces University. Hau was appointed an artillery officer in 1938, and served in the Chinese expeditionary forces in India during World War II. In the subsequent Chinese Civil War he was a staff officer.

As commander of the 9th Infantry Division from 1958 to 1961, Hau presided over the 44-day bombardment of Quemoy by the People's Liberation Army. He commanded the 3rd Corps from 1963 to 1965 and served as Chief Aide to Chiang Kai-shek from 1965 to 1970. He continued his army career as Commander of the 1st Field Army from 1970 to 1973, Deputy Commander-in-Chief of the ROC Army from 1975 to 1977, Executive Vice Chief of the General Staff in the Ministry of National Defense from 1977 to 1978, Commander-in-Chief of the ROC Army 1978 to 1981, and Chief of the General Staff in the Ministry of National Defense from 1981 to 1989. whereas he received the instruction of President Chiang Ching-kuo to investigate the Lieyu Massacre in May 1987.

He was a member of the Central Standing Committee of the Kuomintang from 1984 to 1993 and served as Minister of National Defense from 1989 until 1990 when he was appointed Premier. He was appointed by President Lee Teng-hui in part to mollify the conservative mainlander faction within the KMT that had threatened to run a rival presidential ticket in the March 1990 election. Hau's appointment sparked protests by those who believed it marked retrogression toward military rule, while President Lee defended his decision by saying he valued Hau's tough stance on crime. As premier he held high approval ratings (even higher than Lee's)—he was tough on crime and promoted a multibillion-dollar economic development plan to industrialize Taiwan. Hau submitted his resignation in January 1993 after the KMT's poor showing in the 1992 Legislative Yuan election.

Appointed as one of four vice-chairmen of the KMT in the 14th Party Congress (immediately following the defection of the New Kuomintang Alliance) in another effort by Lee to pacify the mainlander faction, Hau served from 1993 to 1995.

He was expelled from the Kuomintang for his support of New Party candidates in the 1995 legislative elections, and was named Lin Yang-kang's running mate in the 1996 presidential election. Hau rejoined the KMT in 2005.

Personal life
He married Kuo Wan-hua and had two sons and three daughters. One of his sons is politician Hau Lung-pin, the former chairman of the New Party, and former Mayor of Taipei. Kuo Wan-hua died on 12 September 2018, aged 96. Hau was baptized as a Christian on 31 December 2017.

Hau Pei-tsun died of multiple organ failure at Tri-Service General Hospital on 30 March 2020, aged 100. He was posthumously awarded a presidential citation.

References

Citations

Sources 

 Denny Roy, Taiwan: A Political History (Ithaca: Cornell University Press, 2003)

External links 

1919 births
2020 deaths
Anti-Japanese sentiment in Taiwan
Chinese military personnel of World War II
Non-U.S. alumni of the Command and General Staff College
Politicians from Yancheng
Premiers of the Republic of China on Taiwan
Republic of China Army generals
Kuomintang politicians in Taiwan
Republic of China politicians from Jiangsu
Generals from Jiangsu
Republic of China Military Academy alumni
Chinese Civil War refugees
Taiwanese people from Jiangsu
Taiwanese Protestants
Taiwanese centenarians
Men centenarians
Deaths from multiple organ failure